All Smiles is the third and final full-length album by metalcore band Sworn In. It was released via Fearless Records on 30 June 2017.

The record is the last to include vocalist Tyler Dennen, following his second leaving from the band, which occurred in June 2018 (almost a full year after this album's release).

Sound
All Smiles is a notable departure from the band's "moshable" metalcore style that Sworn In were known for on their previous records. The album instead draws more on eccentric influences such as nu metal, noise and dark ambient.

Track listing

Personnel
Sworn In
Tyler Dennen – vocals
Eugene Kamlyuk – guitar
Derek Bolman – bass
Chris George – drums

Production
Kris Crummett

References

2017 albums
Sworn In (band) albums
Fearless Records albums
Albums produced by Kris Crummett